Shingay Preceptory was a Knights Hospitaller priory at Shingay in Cambridgeshire, England. It was established in 1144. The moated site is a scheduled ancient monument.

References

1144 establishments in England
Christian monasteries established in the 12th century
Monasteries in Cambridgeshire
Scheduled monuments in Cambridgeshire